Gornja Vas is a small settlement west of Stranice in the Municipality of Zreče in northeastern Slovenia. The area is part of the traditional region of Styria. It is now included with the rest of the municipality in the Savinja Statistical Region.

References

External links
Gornja Vas at Geopedia

Populated places in the Municipality of Zreče